Chakna or chaakna is a spicy stew, originating from the Indian subcontinent, made out of goat tripe and other animal digestive parts. It is a speciality among Hyderabadi Muslims. In all other parts of India, chakna refers to any snacks/finger foods for consumption with alcohol. The tripe stew includes chunks of liver and kidneys. it's usually taken with liquors throughout India.

See also
 List of goat dishes
 List of Pakistani soups and stews
 List of stews

References

Indian soups and stews
Indian cuisine
Hyderabadi cuisine
Telangana cuisine
Offal
Goat dishes
Muhajir cuisine
Pakistani soups and stews